The 31st Iowa Infantry Regiment was an infantry regiment that served in the Union Army during the American Civil War.

Service
The 31st Iowa Infantry was organized at Davenport, Iowa and mustered in for three years of Federal service on October 13, 1862.

The regiment was mustered out on June 27, 1865.

Total strength and casualties
A total of 1177 men served in the 31st Iowa at one time or another during its existence.
It suffered 1 officer and 27 enlisted men who were killed in action or who died of their wounds and 3 officers and 272 enlisted men who died of disease, for a total of 303 fatalities.

Commanders
Colonel William Smyth
Lieutenant Colonel Jeremiah W. Jenkins

See also
List of Iowa Civil War Units
Iowa in the American Civil War

Notes

References
The Civil War Archive

Units and formations of the Union Army from Iowa
Military units and formations established in 1862
1862 establishments in Iowa
Military units and formations disestablished in 1865